Killjoy is a 2000 American fantasy slasher film directed by Craig Ross, starring Ángel Vargas. It follows a young man who’s murdered and seeks revenge through a killer demon clown named Killjoy. It is the first entry in the Killjoy franchise.

Plot
Two young women, Monique and Jada, are talking when Michael, a nerdy kid walking home from school, encounters them. Jada and Michael are friends, and Michael asks her out, but Jada politely rejects him because she has a boyfriend, a gangster named Lorenzo. Lorenzo, coincidentally, drives by with buddies T-Bone and Baby Boy in the car and sees Michael talking to Jada. They stop and beat up Michael while a homeless man watches on silently from an alley. That night, Michael tries to bring to life a doll he calls Killjoy, but seemingly, it does not work. Lorenzo, T-Bone, and Baby Boy abduct him and bring him to a secluded area where they "accidentally" shoot him. They leave his body.

One year later: Jada is now seeing Jamal but still deals with her feelings for Lorenzo and Michael. Lorenzo is partying with T-Bone and Baby Boy and leaves to meet Kahara, his new girlfriend. T-Bone and Baby Boy encounter an ice cream truck with a clown inside (Killjoy) claiming to sell drugs. Inviting them inside, Killjoy transports them to his lair, an abandoned warehouse. Baby Boy is rammed into the wall by the ice cream truck, killing him. T-Bone finds a lit blunt and smokes it, causing him to burst into flames and disappear. Their battered and burned corpses are shown together in Killjoy’s lair.

Meanwhile, at Kahara‘s apartment, Lorenzo investigates a noise at the door and sees a figure running off. He finds the ice cream truck parked outside, and Killjoy pulls him inside and into his lair. He shoots Killjoy over a dozen times, but Killjoy absorbs the bullets into his body and shoots them out of his mouth, killing Lorenzo.

Jada and Jamal are called to Monique’s apartment for an emergency. Once there, they find Monique with the homeless man from earlier, who brings Jada up to speed on Michael and the gang members‘ fate and the origins of Killjoy, who was brought to life by Michael’s desire for revenge. Killjoy merged with Michael’s spirit in order to gain more power, which he gets by killing. He also tells them that Jada can destroy Killjoy because the love of a young woman can destroy the evil in the heart. Before leaving, he tells them that they have to kill the doll the spirit came from, as the ice cream truck is conveniently parked outside. He then vanishes in front of them.

They go to the truck and are pulled into Killjoy's warehouse, where undead versions of T-Bone, Baby Boy, and Lorenzo, now Killjoy's accomplices, confront them. The trios start fighting, and Monique, Jada, and Jamal kill the henchmen again, their bodies disintegrating. Killjoy comes out, knocking out Jamal and Monique. He asks Jada for a kiss, which Jada agrees to, under one condition: that he will leave her world and never come back. But instead of disappearing, Killjoy transforms into Michael. Michael tells Jada that he did it all for her. Jada stabs Michael to death, and he fades away.

Jamal, Jada, and Monique are about to leave when Killjoy, Lorenzo, T-Bone, and Baby Boy appear behind them. The trio frantically runs back into the ice cream truck and ends up in Michael's house with the Killjoy doll on the floor, encircled by candles. The doll turns into Michael, who constantly begs her for forgiveness, but Jada stabs him, and he turns back into the doll. A portal opens outside, sucking in Baby Boy, T-Bone, and Lorenzo's souls. The trio then watches as Killjoy vaporizes Michael and is sent back to Jada's room, where the homeless man thanks them and vanishes again. The trio goes out to eat, where they are confronted by Ray Jackson and Tamara, both from Jada's English class. Ray says that he gained free access to the club because his brother owns the place. When they ask his brother’s name, he says Killjoy, laughs maniacally, then he and Tamara turn into Lorenzo and Killjoy, respectively, while Jada screams. She wakes up next to Jamal, revealing it to be a nightmare. The film ends with Jamal going seductively under the covers and popping out from under them as Killjoy, indicating he is still alive.

Cast
 Ángel Vargas as Killjoy The Demonic Clown
 Vera Yell as Jada
 Lee Marks as Jamal
 D. Austin as Monique
 Jamal Grimes as Michael
 William L. Johnson as Lorenzo
 Corey Hampton as "T-Bone"
 Rani Goulant as "Baby Boy"
 Napiera Groves as Kahara
 Arthur Burghardt as Homeless Man
 Penny Ford as Singer
 Carl Washington as Ray Jackson
 Dionne Rochelle as Tamara

Release
The film was first released on DVD by Full Moon Home Video in November 2000, then again in 2001. It was also released by Film 2000 on Mar 12, 2001 on DVD. In 2005 it was included in a 4-DVD Collection titled Casket of Death and featuring 4 Full Moon films: The Horrible Doctor Bones, Witchouse, Killjoy, and Vampire Journals. Then between 2012-2017, Echo Bridge Home Entertainment included the film (sometimes with its first two sequels) in at least 10 film collections, either being included with other B-Movie psycho killers or other Full Moon properties. For example, on August 7, 2012 the Killjoy trilogy was paired with the Scarecrow trilogy  and then on November 6, 2012, paired with 9 of the Puppet Master films in a 12-film collection. The distributor rereleased the collection in 2017.

Reception
Reception to the film has been generally mixed. HorrorNews.net gave the film a mixed review, criticizing the film's low-budget set location as "less than desired", and the effectiveness of the title villain, stating: "while somewhat effective as a reoccurring lesser horror icon-style entity, does in fact come across as poor man’s Wishmaster", although asserting that fans of low-budget horror films will likely find it enjoyable.

Chris Summerfield from Scared Stiff Reviews.com awarded the film a negative score of 4.5 out of 10, criticizing the flatness of several of the film's characters, confusing plot points, and lack of scares.

The YouTube channel “brutalmoose” uploaded a video review of the film, ultimately recommending it to their viewers despite its flaws. While the majority of the video consists of the reviewers analyzing the film’s plot for cohesiveness and pointing out the many inconsistencies they argue that the low budget and the progressively confusing script gives it a “so bad, it’s good” quality with one reviewer even admitting to having watched it twice. They also point out the film’s 4 sequels over a nearly 20 year span as evidence of having sustained a fan base of some sort.

DVDbeaver.com made several positive points, despite acknowledging the film’s low budget and resulting technical flaws, saying “It’s watchable and interesting enough”. They also commented on how this film could be seen as a response to Candyman—the contrast being this film featuring “Black characters confronting an urban legend without the need of a white audience identification figure”.

Franchise

The film’s sequel, Killjoy 2: Deliverance from Evil was released in 2002. A second sequel, Killjoy 3 was released in 2010, followed by Killjoy Goes to Hell in 2012, and Killjoy's Psycho Circus in 2016. Trent Hagga took over the role of the Killjoy character in the sequels.

References

External links
 
 
 

Killjoy (film series)
2000 films
American slasher films
2000 horror films
Blaxploitation films
Fictional clowns
Horror films about clowns
2000s English-language films
2000s American films